This is a list of one-shot music videos filmed in one long take by a single camera or manufactured to give the impression it was. One of the most famous music video directors for this genre is Michel Gondry, who has done many of his videos in this style.

Examples

Videos seemingly shot in one take
 John Fogerty – "The Old Man Down the Road", 1985
Contains several edits disguised by dissolves, particularly when the camera is pointing down at the ground and the dissolves are less noticeable due to motion blur.
 U2 – "Numb", 1993
The video was spliced together from two separate takes. The cut between the two happens when the camera turns away from the face of guitarist, and singer on this track, The Edge and the cut was hidden by having smoke blowing in from the side of the frame.
 Primus – "Mr. Krinkle", 1993
One shutter camera cut at 5:26 at the end of the video
 Jamiroquai – "Virtual Insanity", 1996
The video contains several cuts when the camera tilts down, transitioning into another shot when it tilts up again.
 Eagle-Eye Cherry - "Save Tonight", 1997
Several hidden cuts when Eagle-Eye Cherry changes the character he's portraying.
 U2 – "Sweetest Thing", 1998
In a Channel 4, documentary discussing the Greatest Pop Videos of all time, the director Kevin Godley revealed that it was filmed in 3 shots, each shot transition hidden by a lens flare.
 Kylie Minogue – "Love at First Sight", 2002
The video editing process is the same as "Virtual Insanity" by Jamiroquai.
 The Chemical Brothers – "Star Guitar", 2002
The music video, directed by Michel Gondry, features a seemingly continuous shot, but it includes footage taken at different times of the day, and is assembled from repeated sequences.
 Will Young – “Leave Right Now”, 2003
 The video is seemingly one continuous shot, chaos ensues in an art gallery.
 The White Stripes – "Seven Nation Army", 2003
The video is one seemingly continuous shot through a kaleidoscopic tunnel of mirrored black, white and red triangles.
 Alanis Morissette – “Everything”, 2004
The video appears to be one shot but features several cuts where the camera pans upwards.
 Miley Cyrus – "Start All Over", 2007
At the end of the video it has four cuts.
 Khalil Fong – "紅豆 (Red Beans)", 2009
 Hidden cuts during camera moves.
 MIKA – "Blame it on the Girls", 2009
 Hidden cuts from swift camera movement.
 Cheryl – "3 Words", 2009
  The video makes use of split screen cinematography and camera effects for the transition of scenes, meaning Cheryl and will.i.am do not come into physical contact.
 OK Go – "This Too Shall Pass", 2010  - Rube Goldberg Machine video
 In interviews, band member Damian Kulash and visual designer Hector Alvarez both admit to a cut at 2:27 when the curtain opens.
Brian McFadden Featuring Kevin Rudolf – Just Say So, 2010
The video was done in one shot and lip synced backwards to allow for McFadden to still be in sync while the video goes backwards.
 LCD Soundsystem – "Drunk Girls", 2010
 The video is a long take until near the end, when a few cuts are introduced.
 Jessie J – "Who You Are", 2011
 There are several cuts at the end of this video, starting at 3 minutes.
 Kanye West – "Mercy", 2012
 The video is made of multiple long takes superimposed over one another.
 One Direction – "You & I", 2014
 The video was actually stitched from multiple takes to create the illusion of a single, continuous shot.
 Coldplay – "A Sky Full of Stars", 2014
 The video has fourteen cuts.
 Sia – "Big Girls Cry", 2014
The video contains a black cut at 1:12.
Ariana Grande – "One Last Time", 2015
 The video contains multiple cuts, while the screen fades to black.
 Maroon 5 – "This Summer's Gonna Hurt", 2015
 Co-director Travis Schneider stated in an interview that although the video was planned to be one shot, there is one cut in the video.
 Era Istrefi – "Bonbon", 2016
 There are several cuts in the video, starting from 2:25 to the end.
 Ok Go – "Upside Down & Inside Out", 2016
 Though the video, involving the band using parabolic flight from reduced gravity aircraft to simulate micro-gravity, is from one long 40-45 minute shot, periods when the band is not in micro-gravity were trimmed from the final product.
 OK Go – "The One Moment", 2016
 The video drastically slows down playback of about 4.2 seconds of actions that take place in real-time. However, to capture the amount of action, the band had to use multiple high-speed cameras on the same mounted system, their respective footage stitched together to compose the final video.
 Jax Jones – "You Don't Know Me", 2017
 The video contains cut at 1:35, also several cuts near the end of the video.
 Dua Lipa – "IDGAF", 2018
The video editing process is the same as "Virtual Insanity" by Jamiroquai and "Love at First Sight" by Kylie Minogue.
 George Ezra – "Shotgun", 2018
The video is one shot of George Ezra going round in circles.
 Tish – "Try to C", 2019
One Cut at 2:28.
 Sam Fischer – "This City", 2019
 The video is one shot recorded In 2017, released January 18, 2018 (Re-released December 13, 2019)
 Birds of Tokyo – "Two of Us", 2020
One shutter camera cut at 0:02 in the beginning of the video
 AJR (band) – "Bang!", 2020
The camera moves forwards 3 times and has 9 cuts on this video
 Tame Impala – "Lost in Yesterday", 2020
One cut for each "loop" around the wedding reception.
 Billie Eilish – "Therefore I Am", 2020
The video contains a black cut at 2:01.
 Hinatazaka46 – "Kimi Shika Katan", 2021
Possible cuts when the camera is pointed at the ground.

References

One shot
One-shot films